The Minaret of Jam is a UNESCO World Heritage Site in western Afghanistan. It is located in a remote and nearly inaccessible region of the Shahrak District, Ghor Province, next to the Hari River. Since 2002, the minaret has remained on the list of World Heritage in Danger, under serious threat of erosion, and has not been actively preserved. In 2014, the BBC reported that the tower was in imminent danger of collapse.

In 2020, the Minaret of Jam was listed among cultural heritage sites of the Islamic world by the Islamic World Educational, Scientific and Cultural Organization (ICESCO). According to the Afghan Ministry of Foreign Affairs (MoFA), the Minaret of Jam is Afghanistan's first cultural heritage site to be listed by ICESCO.

Etymology 
The word minaret is Arabic [منارة] and usually means a tower next to a mosque from which the muezzin calls the faithful to prayer. However it also means lighthouse and has other meanings. Here it is used loosely.

Site 
The Minaret of Jaam is probably located at the site of the Ghurid Dynasty's capital, Firozkoh.

The circular minaret rests on an octagonal base; it had 2 wooden balconies and was topped by a lantern. Its formal presentation has a striking similarity to the Ghazni minarets built by Masud III. It is thought to have been a direct inspiration for the Qutub Minar in Delhi, India.

The Minaret of Jam belongs to a group of around 60 minarets and towers built between the 11th and the 13th centuries in Central Asia, Iran and Afghanistan, including the Kutlug Timur Minaret in Old Urgench (long considered the tallest of these still in existence). The minarets are thought to have been built as symbols of Islam's victory, while other towers were simply landmarks or watchtowers.

The archaeological landscape around Jam includes the ruins of a 'palace', fortifications, a pottery kiln and a Jewish cemetery, and has been suggested to be the remains of the lost city of Turquoise Mountain. Analysis of the "robber holes" around the site, high-resolution satellite images and data from Google Maps has led to an estimate that the Ghūrid summer capital around the minaret was about 19.5 hectares in size.

The archaeological site of Jam was successfully nominated as Afghanistan's first World Heritage site in 2002. It was also inscribed in UNESCO's list of World Heritage in Danger, due to the precarious state of preservation of the minaret, and the results of looting at the site.

According to archaeologists, a Jewish cemetery was also discovered 10 kilometers away from the minaret including remains from a military building, a palace and pottery jars.

History 

During the 12th and 13th century, the Ghurids controlled what is now Afghanistan, but also parts of eastern Iran, Central Asia, Northern India and parts of Pakistan.

The Arabic inscription dating the minaret is unclear – it could read 1193/4 or 1174/5 when converted to Gregorian dates. It could thus commemorate the victory of the Ghurid sultan Ghiyas ud-Din over the Ghaznevids in 1186 in Lahore. However, Dr. Ralph Pinder-Wilson, a British Archeologist and Director of the British Institute of Afghan Studies in the 1970s, wrote a major study of the Minarets of Jam and Ghazni in which he expressed his belief that the minaret was built to commemorate the victory of Mu'izz ad-Din, Ghiyath ud-Din's brother, over Prithviraj Chauhan. This victory allowed Islam to spread into the northern Indian subcontinent. Pinder-Wilson believed that the minaret was built in the style of the time, which included a tradition of early Islamic victory towers proclaiming the conquering power of Islam.

It is assumed that the Minaret was attached to the Friday Mosque of Firozkoh, which the Ghurid chronicler Abu 'Ubayd al-Juzjani states was washed away in a flash flood, some time before the Mongol sieges in the early 13th century. Work at Jam by the Minaret of Jam Archaeological Project has found evidence of a large courtyard building beside the minaret, and evidence of river sediments on top of the baked-brick paving.

The Ghurid Empire's glory waned after the death of Ghiyath ud-Din in 1202, as it was forced to cede territory to the Khwarezm Empire. Juzjani states that Firuzkuh was destroyed by the Mongols in 1222.

The Minaret was little known outside of Afghanistan until Sir Thomas Holdich reported it in 1886 while working for the Afghan Boundary Commission.  It did not come to world attention, however, until 1957 through the work of the French archaeologists André Maricq and Gaston Wiet. Later, Werner Herberg conducted limited surveys around the site in the 1970s, and Ralph Pinder-Wilson completed his major study of the site in the same decade, before the Soviet invasion of 1979 once again cut off outside access.

2022 earthquake

On January 17, 2022, an earthquake struck western Afghanistan, killing 28 people. The earthquake caused bricks to fall from the tower and it is now at an even further risk of collapsing.

Inscriptional content 

The uppermost band consists of the Muslim confession of faith, the shahada; "I bear witness there is no god but Allah (and that) Muhammad is the messenger of Allah."
Below this, are upper two bands that consists of verse 13, surat al-Saff LXI;"Help from Allah and present victory. Give good tidings (O Muhammad) to believers. O ye who believe."
The band below this consists of names and titles of Ghiyath ad-Din Muhammad bin Sam
Located below this is a band containing an amplified version of Ghiyath ad-Din Muhammad's names and titles in turquoise mosaic tiles.
An oblong hexagon with two lines of naskhi underneath, (1)"The work of 'Ali ibn...", (2)undeciphered
An inscription, "Abu'l-Fath", heavily damaged, due to being made of stucco.
Interlaced bands consisting of surat Maryam XIX.
Facing north is a Kufic inscription, "On the date of the year five hundred ninety"(equivalent of 27 December 1193 to 16 December 1194).

Threats 
The Minaret of Jam is threatened by erosion, water infiltration and floods, due to its proximity to the Hari and Jam Rivers. Another threat is the earthquakes that happen frequently in the region. The tower has been tilting, and stabilisation work has been carried out at various times.

Following his 2002 visit, British explorer and future Member of Parliament Rory Stewart reported that looters and illegal excavations had also damaged the archaeological site surrounding the minaret.

On 21 July 2018 Pajhwok News reported Taliban clashes with local forces at checkpoints near the Minaret of Jam in a 6-hour long skirmish. The militants set the forests surrounding the historic district on fire, damaging a mosque.

Ghor Director of Culture and Information Fakhruddin Ariapoor expressed concern at the instability in the area, stating that some parts of the green area were damaged; and although the minaret remained intact, warned that if the central government did not pay due attention to the security of the site, the militants would destroy it.

Conservation 
The minaret was largely rediscovered in 1958 by French explorers. From its finding to the early 1970s, there were active restoration efforts and scientific studies conducted in order to slow the decay process. However, after the Soviet invasion of Afghanistan, no efforts were made.

UNESCO has tried to launch assessment programs. In 2012 UNESCO outlined plans for 3D scanning, hydraulic measurements, and strengthening of support beams and walls to maintain the Minaret, and photos of the external structure have been taken to provide models for future reconstruction. Although the 3D modelling of the minaret was finally carried out for UNESCO by Iconem, political instability has led to a lack of funding and no maintenance efforts have been conducted. Furthermore, the surrounding terrain has made it difficult to make any progress of the structure as it impedes access. However, these assessments have provided a strong basis for future maintenance. While fieldwork remains difficult, archaeologists have analyzed satellite images and data from Google Maps to make new discoveries about the minaret and the surrounding site.

Much can be and needs to be done to aid in the conservation of the minaret. Security should be one of the primary focuses as looting is a commonplace of the archeological site. Likewise, it is important that the people of Afghanistan get involved in that their interest and engagement in the site will hopefully fund future efforts for preservation.

Gallery

See also
 Ghazni Minarets
 Musalla Minarets of Herat

References

Further reading 
 Dupree, Nancy Hatch (1977): An Historical Guide to Afghanistan. 1st Edition: 1970. 2nd Edition. Revised and Enlarged. Afghan Tourist Organization

 Freya Stark: The Minaret of Djam, an excursion in Afghanistan, London: John Murray, 1970
 Dan Cruickshank (ed.), Sir Banister Fletcher's A History of Architecture, 20th edition, Architectural Press 1996, 
 Herberg, W. with D. Davary, 1976. Topographische Feldarbeiten in Ghor: Bericht über Forschungen zum Problem Jam-Ferozkoh. Afghanistan Journal 3/2, 57–69.
 Maricq, A. & G. Wiet, 1959. Le Minaret de Djam: la découverte de la capitale des Sultans Ghurides (XIIe-XIIIe siècles). (Mémoires de la Délégation archéologique française en Afghanistan 16). Paris.
 Sourdel-Thomine, J., 2004. Le minaret Ghouride de Jam. Un chef d'oeuvre du XIIe siècle. Paris: Memoire de l'Academie des Inscriptions et Belles Lettres.
 Stewart, Rory. 2006. The Places In Between. Harvest Books. .
Thomas, David, 2018. The Ebb and Flow of the Ghurid Empire. Sydney University Press. .
 Thomas, David, 2004. Looting, heritage management and archaeological strategies at Jam, Afghanistan
 Thomas, D.C., G. Pastori & I. Cucco, 2004. “Excavations at Jam, Afghanistan.” East and West 54 (Nos. 1–4) pp. 87–119.
 Thomas, D.C., G. Pastori & I. Cucco, 2005. The Minaret of Jam Archaeological Project at Antiquity
 Thomas, D.C., & A. Gascoigne, in press. Recent Archaeological Investigations of Looting at Jam, Ghur Province, in J. van Krieken (ed.) Afghanistan’s Cultural Heritage: its Fall and Survival.  Leiden: E.J. Brill.

External links 

 Minaret of Jam Archaeological Project
 UNESCO site on threats to the minaret
 UNESCO World Heritage Center-Minaret and Archaeological Remains of Jam
 Asian Historical Architecture: Minaret of Jam
 Turquoise Mountain Foundation
 Hidden jewel of Afghan culture BBC News 3 May 2008

Buildings and structures in Ghor Province
Jam
World Heritage Sites in Danger
Jam